Tineretului Park ("Youth's Park") is a large public park in southern Bucharest (Sector 4).

History
The park, which was created in 1965 and finished in 1974,
was planned by the architect Valentin Donose. It was designed as the main recreational space for southern Bucharest, an area which was heavily developed during the 1960s and 1970s.

Landmarks
Aside from green areas, the park contains a number of playgrounds as well as a navigable lake, utilised by leisure boats in summer. Tineretului Park contains the Sala Polivalentă, one of Bucharest's largest multi-purpose halls, used for concerts and indoor sporting events.

The south-east corner of the park is a children's area called "Orăşelul Copiilor" ("Children's Mini-town"). Within Orăşelul Copiilor one can find fair ground rides, small rollercoasters and other fun rides for all ages. There is a mini train that takes people around the park. In 2013  the area was redesigned and new open-bars and recreational areas and attractions were constructed. Along them a new beautiful dancing fountain can be admired.

Transportation
The park is serviced by two Metro stations: Tineretului and Constantin Brâncoveanu.

References

Parks in Bucharest
1974 establishments in Romania